The Scout and Guide movement in Ivory Coast is served by
 Fédération Ivoirienne du Scoutisme Féminin, member of the World Association of Girl Guides and Girl Scouts; consisting of:
 Guides catholiques de Côte d'Ivoire
 Eclaireuses laïques de Côte d'Ivoire
 Eclaireuses unionistes de Côte d'Ivoire
 Fédération Ivoirienne du Scoutisme, member of the World Organization of the Scout Movement; consisting of:
 Scouts catholiques de Côte d'Ivoire
 Eclaireurs laïcs de Côte d'Ivoire
 Eclaireurs unionistes de Côte d'Ivoire
several non-aligned Scouting organizations, including
 Conférence Ivorienne du Scoutisme
 Eclaireurs neutres de Côte d'Ivoire
 Scouts d'Afrique de Côte d'Ivoire
 Scouts marins de Côte d'Ivoire
 Scouts musulmans de Côte d'Ivoire
 Scouts de l'université de Côte d'Ivoire
 Scouts protestants de Côte d'Ivoire
 Scouts évangélistes de Côte d'Ivoire
 Scouts adventistes de Côte d'Ivoire
 Raiders de Côte d'Ivoire

See also

External links
 Eclaireurs neutres de Côte d'Ivoire
 Scouts d'Afrique de Côte d'Ivoire